Eildon is the largest committee area of the Scottish Borders Council, with a population of 34,892 at the census in 2001. It also contains the three Eildon Hills, tallest in the Scottish Borders.

Places in Eildon

References

See also
Subdivisions of Scotland